Pan-Asia may refer to: 
 East Asia
 Asia-Pacific

See also 
ASEAN Plus Three
Pan-Asianism